Oneil Cruz (born October 4, 1998) is a Dominican professional baseball player for the Pittsburgh Pirates of Major League Baseball (MLB). He made his MLB debut in 2021.

Career

Los Angeles Dodgers
Cruz signed with the Los Angeles Dodgers in July 2015 as an international free agent for a $950,000 signing bonus.
Cruz made his professional debut in 2016 with DSL Dodgers 1, batting .294 with 23 runs batted in (RBIs) in 55 games. He began the 2017 season with the Great Lakes Loons.

Pittsburgh Pirates
On July 31, 2017, the Dodgers traded Cruz and Angel German to the Pirates in exchange for Tony Watson. He was then assigned to the West Virginia Power. 
In 105 games between the two clubs, he slashed .237/.297/.350 with 10 home runs and 44 RBIs.

In 2018, he played for the West Virginia Black Bears, batting .286 with 14 home runs and 56 RBIs in 103 games, earning South Atlantic League All-Star honors. Cruz began 2019 at Rookie-level with the FCL Pirates, batting .298 with zero home runs in three games. He was then promoted to the Class A-Advanced Bradenton Marauders, and slashed .302/.345/.515, hit seven home runs, and stole seven bases in 35 games. Then he was promoted to the Double-A Altoona Curve on July 30 with a slash line of .269/.346/.412 with one home run in 35 games. He missed two months during the season after suffering a fractured foot.

Cruz was added to the Pirates 40-man roster following the 2019 season. He did not play in 2020 due to the cancellation of the Minor League Baseball season because of the COVID-19 pandemic. Cruz split the 2021 minor league season between Altoona and the Triple-A Indianapolis Indians, hitting a combined .310/.375/.594 with 17 home runs, 47 RBIs, and 19 stolen bases. 

On October 2, 2021, Cruz was promoted to the active roster for the first time to make his MLB debut. He appeared in two Major League games in the 2021 season and hit his first career home run on October 3 in Pittsburgh.

On March 29, 2022, it was announced that Cruz would not make the team out of Spring Training, and was optioned to Triple-A Indianapolis to begin the year. Over five spring training games, he batted .333 with two home runs. He was recalled to make his season debut on June 20 against the Chicago Cubs, where he collected two hits, two runs, and four RBIs.

On August 24, 2022, Cruz hit the hardest-hit ball in the Statcast era against Atlanta Braves pitcher Kyle Wright.

Personal life
Cruz is the son of retired minor leaguer Rafael Cruz. The elder Cruz named his son after his favorite player, former New York Yankees outfielder Paul O'Neill.

On September 22, 2020, Cruz was involved in a deadly vehicle crash in the Dominican Republic in which three people were killed. The accident occurred when his Jeep collided with a motorcycle carrying the three deceased that was traveling with no lights in the same direction that Cruz was traveling. Cruz survived the fatal accident without serious injury.

Cruz is unusually tall for a shortstop. The only taller major league shortstop was  Joel Guzmán, who played nine innings for the Tampa Bay Rays in 2007. There have been three  major leaguers who started some games at shortstop — Archi Cianfrocco, Troy Glaus, and Michael Morse.

References

External links

1998 births 
Living people
Altoona Curve players
Bradenton Marauders players
Dominican Republic expatriate baseball players in the United States
Dominican Summer League Dodgers players
Gigantes del Cibao players
Toros del Este players
Great Lakes Loons players
Gulf Coast Pirates players
Indianapolis Indians players
Leones del Escogido players
Major League Baseball players from the Dominican Republic
Major League Baseball shortstops
People from Peravia Province
Peoria Javelinas players
Pittsburgh Pirates players
West Virginia Power players